The Barossa Range (Kaurna: Yampoori) is a mountain range located in the Australian state of South Australia.

Location
The range is a part of the southern Mount Lofty Ranges and the western slopes primarily fall into the Barossa Valley. As such, the range is the main source for the North Para River and its tributary Jacob's Creek. Mengler Hill, another notable peak within the range, lies on the road route from Tanunda to Angaston.

Naming
The range was named by Colonel William Light in 1837 after Barrosa Hill (Cerro de Puerco) in the modern municipality of Chiclana de la Frontera, Spain, to which it he thought it similar. The Spanish location was the site of the Battle of Barrosa and was won by Light's friend Lord Lynedoch (Lt. Gen. Sir Thomas Graham) in 1811. The word barrosa (mis-spelt in the naming of the valley, two 'r' and one 's' becoming one 'r' and two 's'; similarly the nearby town of 'Lyndoch' rather than 'Lynedoch'), in Spanish and Portuguese languages simply means "muddy". Confusion regarding the spelling and origin of the range also resulted in mistaken moves to change it as part of 'de-Germaning' during the First World War ('Kaiser Stuhl', for example, temporarily being renamed 'Mount Kitchener').  Thus named, the Barossa Range was the source of many other local place names, such as the Hundred of Barossa and better-known Barossa Valley.

Settled features
The Heysen Walking Trail and the Mawson Cycling Trail both traverse the range. 

It is also home to some of the many wineries in the region, including those in Eden Valley.

See also
Barossa Valley (wine)

References

Mountain ranges of South Australia
Barossa Valley